Ensemble La Fenice is a period wind band based in the town of Auxerre in the Burgundy region of France. 

Founded in 1990 by the cornett player Jean Tubéry, the ensemble specializes in music of the Baroque era played on period instruments.

External links
La Fenice Ensemble home page

 

French orchestras
Chamber orchestras
Musical groups established in 1990
1990 establishments in France
Musical groups from Bourgogne-Franche-Comté